Antonio "Moogie" Canazio is a Brazilian recording engineer, mixing engineer and record producer known for his work with Antônio Carlos Jobim, Caetano Veloso, Ivan Lins, João Gilberto, Ray Charles, Sarah Vaughan and Luis Miguel.

He has won two Grammy Awards, five Latin Grammy Awards, and two Midsouth Emmy Awards. He currently serves as vice-chairman of the Latin Recording Academy Board of Trustees and as chairman of the Latin Recording Academy Circle of Producers and Engineers (CPI), equivalent to the Recording Academy Producers and Engineers Wing.

Early life and career 
Canazio started as a DJ in his hometown, Rio de Janeiro. Soon, following his desire to play music, he started playing the drums.

In 1978, Canazio moved to Los Angeles to pursue a career as a recording engineer. He enrolled in sound engineering courses and started doing office work at Kendun Recorders in Burbank. Soon, he became assistant engineer, recording artists including George Benson, Chicago and REO Speedwagon.

Canazio moved back to Rio de Janeiro in 1981. He worked at the record label Som Livre recording música popular brasileira (MPB). In 1989, Canazio returned to Los Angeles. In 1992 he became the first Brazilian engineer to be nominated in the "Best Engineered Album - non classical" category at the Grammy Awards for his work in Sergio Mendes' album Brasileiro. He was nominated again in this same category in 1996 and 2012.

Canazio has been nominated nine times in the "Best Engineered Album - non classical" category at the Latin Grammy Awards, winning the award at the 9th Annual Latin Grammy Awards in 2008. Canazio was nominated for the Latin Grammy Award for the Producer of the Year at the 7th and 13th Latin Grammy Awards in 2006 and 2013, respectively.

Awards

Grammy Awards

Latin Grammy Awards

Midsouth Emmy Awards 
Canazio has won two Midsouth Emmy Awards for his work on "The Passion for Music" and "Heart of Inspiration".

References 

Grammy Award winners
Latin Grammy Award winners
Jazz record producers
Brazilian expatriates in the United States
People from Rio de Janeiro (city)
Brazilian record producers
Year of birth missing (living people)
Living people
Latin music record producers